The following radio stations broadcast on FM frequency 93.8 MHz:

China 
 Beijing Wenyi Radio in Beijing (cabel FM)
 CNR Business Radio in Nanchang

Fiji
 Mix FM in Lautoka, Nadi and Suva

Malaysia
 Sinar in Kota Bharu and Kelantan

New Zealand
 The Sound in Wanaka

Singapore
 CNA938

References

Lists of radio stations by frequency